Hemiliano Gomes Lopes (born 23 January 1993), known simply as Hemiliano, is a Bissau-Guinean footballer who plays for Portuguese club SL Cartaxo as a forward.

Football career
Born in Bissau, Hemiliano started playing organized football at already 18, with G.D. Ribeirão for his last year as a junior. In 2012, he joined F.C. Arouca also in Portugal, making his debut as a professional on 14 October 2012 as he appeared as a late substitute in a 1–0 home win against C.D. Trofense, for the season's Portuguese Cup.

Hemiliano played his first match in the second division on 30 December 2012, starting in a 1–1 draw at C.F. União.

References

External links

1993 births
Living people
Sportspeople from Bissau
Bissau-Guinean footballers
Association football forwards
Liga Portugal 2 players
Segunda Divisão players
F.C. Arouca players
O Elvas C.A.D. players
Caldas S.C. players
C.D. Mafra players
S.C.U. Torreense players
Paris 13 Atletico players
Bissau-Guinean expatriate footballers
Expatriate footballers in Portugal
Bissau-Guinean expatriate sportspeople in Portugal